Dagenham Town Football Club was a football club based in Dagenham, England.

History
Dagenham Town were formed in 1929, after West Ham & District Thursday League club Lombardians were renamed at their 1929 AGM. Dagenham joined the London League, also entering the FA Cup for the first time in the 1929–30 season, taking Welsh club Barry to a replay in the first round, losing 1–0 at West Ham United's Boleyn Ground. Dagenham Town would enter the FA Cup on two more occasions, in 1931 and 1939. Following the outbreak of World War II, Dagenham were playing in the South Essex Combination. The club never re-appeared following the war, with former directors of the club forming Dagenham British Legion in 1946.

Ground
The club initially played at the Leytonstone's High Road ground, before moving to Glebe Road in Dagenham.

Records
Best FA Cup performance: First round, 1929–30

References

London League (football)
Sport in the London Borough of Barking and Dagenham
Dagenham
1929 establishments in England
Association football clubs established in 1929
1940 disestablishments in England
Association football clubs disestablished in 1940
Essex County League
Defunct football clubs in London